Conor Carragh Ó Curnín (died 1498) was an Irish poet.

Ó Curnín was a member of a brehon literary family of Breifne.

The Annals of the Four Masters record his death, sub anno 1498:

 O'Cuirnin, i.e. Conor Carragh, died.

See also
 Cormac Ó Curnín, died 1474
 Ruaidrí Ó Curnín, died 1496
 Ferceirtne Ó Curnín, died 1519
 Domhnall Glas Ó Curnín, died 1519

References
 http://www.ucc.ie/celt/published/T100005D/
 http://www.irishtimes.com/ancestor/surname/index.cfm?fuseaction=Go.&UserID=

Medieval Irish poets
People from County Leitrim
1498 deaths
Year of birth unknown
15th-century Irish poets
Irish male poets